The U.S. state of Alabama has 73 known indigenous amphibian species.  These indigenous species include 30 frog and toad species and 43 salamander species.  Two of these native species may have become extirpated within the state. They are the Mississippi gopher frog and flatwoods salamander.

Human predation, pollution, and habitat destruction has placed several amphibian species at risk of extirpation or extinction.  The Alabama Department of Conservation and Natural Resources lists the conservation status of each species within the state with a rank of lowest, low, moderate, high, and highest concern.

Frogs and toads

Salamanders

References

Amphibians
Alabama
.Amphibians